İncekaya Aqueduct is  an 18th-century aqueduct in Karabük Province, Turkey.

The aqueduct is to the north of Safranbolu ilçe (district) It is over Tokatlı Canyon. The aqueduct was commissioned by Safranbolulu Izzet Mehmet Pasha, a citizen of Safranbolu and a grand vizier of the Ottoman Empire between 1794–1798. The structure was used to supply water to Safranbolu.

The building material of the aqueduct is rubble stone. There are six arches; one main arch and five auxiliary arches.

References

Ottoman bridges in Turkey
Aqueducts in Turkey
Safranbolu District
Tourist attractions in Karabük Province
Buildings and structures completed in the 18th century
Buildings and structures in Karabük Province